A bobsled roller coaster is a roller coaster that uses a track design that is essentially a "pipe" with the top half removed and has cars that are sent down this pipe in a freewheeling mode. The name derives from the great similarity to the track design used for the winter sport of bobsleigh.

Most modern bobsled roller coasters are made of steel; however, the first bobsled coasters, known as Flying Turns, were made of wood. On October 4, 2013, after seven years of construction, Knoebels in Pennsylvania opened the world's only modern wooden Flying Turns coaster, Flying Turns.  The ride was scheduled to open in 2007, but had been delayed due to dysfunctional wheels and other issues. As there were no historic plans available, the new coaster was designed entirely from scratch.

Both the bobsled coaster and the Flying Turns coaster are buildable in the RollerCoaster Tycoon and Thrillville series of video games.

Installations 
As of 2012, 21 bobsled roller coasters have been built. The roller coasters are listed in order of opening dates.

 * Denotes that exact closing date is not known.
 † The Screamin' Delta Demon was transported to Old Indiana Fun Park following Opryland's closure in 1998, but was never reassembled and eventually scrapped.

References

External links 

 
Types of roller coaster
Roller coasters manufactured by Intamin
Roller coasters manufactured by Mack Rides